Goodlands is an unincorporated rural community in the Municipality of Brenda-Waskada within the Canadian province of Manitoba. The community is located east of Waskada and west of the Turtle Mountains. The Carbury–Goodlands Border Crossing is located a short distance to the south. Goodlands has a grain elevator which used to be served by the Canadian Pacific Railway Lyleton Line until 1996, when the local railway was abandoned.

Notable people
 Chris Nielsen - Former NHL hockey player

References 

Designated places in Manitoba